The Hall of Worthies, or Jiphyeonjeon, was a royal research institute set up by Sejong the Great of the Korean Joseon Dynasty in March 1420. Set up during the beginning of his reign, King Sejong staffed the Hall of Worthies with talented scholars and instructed them to conduct a variety of research activities to strengthen his rule and the nation. The Hall of Worthies is well-known for its role in compiling the Hunminjeongeum, the original treatise on Hangul.

Purpose
The Hall of Worthies originally served an advisory role to the king, and King Sejong restructured and expanded its role into an academic research institute. During the early part of King Sejong's reign, the Hall of Worthies served as a legislative system, but its role eventually grew to hold discussions regarding Joseon's national policy. The Hall of Worthies would also later act as an organ of press.

Achievements
The Hall of Worthies participated in various scholarly endeavors, one of which was compiling the Hunminjeongeum. Hangul was personally created by Sejong the Great, and revealed by him in 1443. Afterward, King Sejong wrote the preface to the Hunminjeongeum, explaining the origin and purpose of Hangul and providing brief examples and explanations, and then tasked the Hall of Worthies to write detailed examples and explanations. The head of the Hall of Worthies, Jeong In-ji, was responsible for compiling the Hunminjeongeum. The Hunminjeongeum was published and promulgated to the public in 1446.

Confucianism ideals were very important to King Sejong, and he wanted his subjects to have a medium through which they could learn the ethics and morals of Confucianism. During his 14th year in power, King Sejong instructed his scholars at the Hall of Worthies to compile outstanding examples of the fundamental principles in human relationships (filial piety, loyalty to the state, and wifely devotion) from both Korean and Chinese history. This compilation of works would become the book "Conduct of the Three Fundamental Principles in Human Relationships" (Samgang Haengshildo, Hanja: 三綱行實圖, Hangul: 삼강행실도). Unfortunately, this work was originally recorded in Chinese characters, and thus, the general public could not read it until it was translated into hangul some 30 years later.

Besides contributing to the Hunminjeongeum and publishing the Samgang Haengshildo, the Hall of Worthies was involved in publication of numerous scholarly and scientific writings, which contributed to reputation of Sejong's reign as the golden age of Korean culture.

Disbandment
The Hall of Worthies was disbanded by King Sejo after many of its members (notably the six martyred ministers) plotted to assassinate Sejo in 1456, following the latter's usurpation of the throne from King Danjong. However, a similar organization, the Hongmungwan, Office of Special Advisors, continued much of the same work, though without enjoying the same prestige or output it had during the earlier period.

Famous scholars
Jeong Inji (1396-1478)
Shin Suk-ju (1417-1475)
Choi Hang (1409-1474)
Seong Sammun (1418-1456)
Pak Paengnyeon (1417-1456)
Yi Gae (1417-1456)
Yu Seong-won (?-1456)
Yi Sukhyeong (1415-1477)
Seo Geojeong (1420-1488)

Members of the Hall of Worthies who plotted against King Sejo
Pak Jungrim: minister, father of Pak Paengnyeon
Pak Paengnyeon: vice-minister, one of six martyred ministers
Ha Wiji: vice-minister, one of six martyred ministers
Seong Sammun: royal secretary, one of six martyred ministers
Yi Gae: chief of the Hall of Worthies, one of six martyred ministers
Yu Seong-won: high official of Sungkyunkwan, one of six martyred ministers
Pak Innyeon: younger brother of Pak Paengnyeon
Pak Kinyeon: younger brother of Pak Paengnyeon
Heo Jo: brother-in-law of Yi Gae
Sim Shin

See also
Joseon Dynasty politics
Korean Confucianism

References

Education in the Joseon dynasty
15th century in Korea